Ranghana is a genus of moths in the subfamily Arctiinae. It contains the single species Ranghana punctata, which is found in India.

References

Natural History Museum Lepidoptera generic names catalog

Lithosiini
Monotypic moth genera